Kongde Ri (sometimes Kwangde Ri) is a mountain in the Himalaya of eastern Nepal. The mountain is located four km west of Namche Bazaar.

The mountain is classified as a trekking peak, but it is considered one of the more difficult to climb. A climbing permit costs US$350 for up to 4 climbers.

References

Mountains of Koshi Province
Six-thousanders of the Himalayas